The 2005 FIFA World Player of the Year prize was awarded to the Brazilian Ronaldinho for the second year in succession, also claiming the highest point total ever, surpassing Rivaldo. He finished ahead of Chelsea midfielder Frank Lampard and his Barcelona teammate Samuel Eto'o in the final round of voting.

Results

Men

Women

FIFA World Player of the Year
FIFA World Player of the Year winners